The state of Serbia and Montenegro ceased to exist in 2006.  The following articles cover transport in the successor states:

Transport in Serbia
Transport in Montenegro